Dock Branch Park is a public park which is currently being built in Birkenhead, Merseyside, England. The idea for the park came from Wirral Council's long–term vision for the development of Birkenhead, known as the Birkenhead 2040 Framework. As part of this framework, the council hoped to create more parks and green spaces for the public.

The park will stretch from Bidston Dock to Rock Ferry, utilising land that was previously occupied by the Birkenhead Dock Branch railway line. The railway line was created in 1847 but with the decline of the docks and rail freight traffic it has been disused since 1993.

Costing around £13 million, the park will be over a mile long and will cover 30 hectares of land. It is hoped that the park will provide a pedestrian and cycle–friendly route as well as providing land for 1,000 homes a new venue for Wirral Transport Museum.
Clearance work on the site began in May 2022, with full construction planned to start in autumn 2023 with completion estimated to be in autumn 2025.

See also
Birkenhead Park

References

Parks and commons in the Metropolitan Borough of Wirral
Birkenhead
Urban public parks